Ermistu is a village in Tõstamaa Parish, Pärnu County, in southwestern Estonia. It has a population of 55 (as of 1 January 2011).

Lake Ermistu is located on the western side of the village.

Gallery

References

Villages in Pärnu County
Kreis Pernau